The Challenge Cup semi final is played to determine the teams who play in the Challenge Cup final.

List of Challenge Cup Cup semi-finals

Semi Final Key

1890s

1980s

1990s

2000s

2010s

See also

References

External links
 The Challenge Cup at therfl.co.uk

Challenge Cup